James Wyatt (1746–1813) was an English architect.

James Wyatt may also refer to:
James Bosley Noel Wyatt (1847–1926), American architect
James Wyatt (game designer) (born ca. 1968–1969), American game designer
James Wyatt (air engineer) (active 1920–1922), English aviator
James Ray Wyatt, American politician

See also